The 2005 NFL Europe season was the 13th season in 15 years of the American Football league that started out as the World League of American Football. The Hamburg Sea Devils replaced the Scottish Claymores for the 2005 season.

World Bowl XIII
World Bowl XIII was held on Saturday, June 11, 2005 at LTU Arena in Düsseldorf, Germany. The Amsterdam Admirals defeated the Berlin Thunder, 27–21.

References 

 
2005 in American football
NFL Europe (WLAF) seasons